is a Japanese horror manga artist who is known for his works Mugen Shinshi and Gakkō no Kaidan. He graduated from Komazawa University. He made his professional manga debut in 1977, and has had stories published in the manga anthology series Petit Apple Pie.

Kouta Hirano, the Japanese manga artist, says that Takahashi is a treasure to the Japanese Manga world.

References

External links
 Yosuke Takahashi manga at Media Arts Database 

1956 births
Komazawa University alumni
Living people
Manga artists from Nagano Prefecture